Långa nätter is the debut studio album by the Swedish singer-songwriter Melissa Horn, released 30 April 2008, on Sony Music Entertainment. It was produced by Lasse Englund and Jan Radesjö. The album features the singles "Långa nätter", "En famn för mig" and "Som jag hade dig förut", a duet with Lars Winnerbäck.

Track listing

Charts

References

2008 debut albums
Melissa Horn albums